Nadja Horwitz (born 10 March 1996) is a Chilean competitive sailor. She competed at the 2016 Summer Olympics in Rio de Janeiro, in the women's 470 class. Her brother Kai Horwitz is an Olympic alpine skier for Chile.

References

1996 births
Living people
Chilean female sailors (sport)
Olympic sailors of Chile
Sailors at the 2016 Summer Olympics – 470
Jewish Chilean sportspeople
21st-century Chilean women